is a Japanese footballer who plays for Omiya Ardija on loan from Giravanz Kitakyushu.

Club statistics
Updated to 23 February 2018.

References

External links
Profile at Mito HollyHock
Profile at Júbilo Iwata

1996 births
Living people
Association football people from Chiba Prefecture
Japanese footballers
J1 League players
J2 League players
Júbilo Iwata players
Mito HollyHock players
Association football goalkeepers